Square-summable may refer to:

 Square-integrable functions
 Square-summable sequences; see Sequence space#ℓp spaces